Boaz Arad (16 March 1956 – 2 February 2018) was an Israeli visual artist. He worked in a variety of media including painting, sculpture, photography, and video.

Biography 
Arad was born in Tel Aviv in 1956. Arad studied art at the Avni Institute of Art and Design in Tel Aviv in 1978–1982.

His work is in collections of a number of museums, including the Israel Museum in Jerusalem.

In 2003, Arad was a recipient of a Prize for the "Encouragement of Creative Art", awarded by the Israeli Ministry of Education and Culture.

Controversy
On February 1, 2018, the Israeli news portal Mako reported that Boaz Arad was under investigation for alleged sexual relationships with female students at the Thelma Yellin School of Art in Givatayim where he taught from 1983 until 2006. The article included an interview with one of the students, who related that the relationship started when she was 16 and lasted for four years, partly after she graduated from the school. She said that she knew about other female students who had had relationships with Arad. According to the report, Arad asked the student to keep the relationship secret and when she reached 18, she moved in with him. After the story was published, Arad was contacted by Mako and confirmed he had had relationships with the women indicated in the report, but denied the fact they started while the women were students in the school. He also complained that from the moment the story broke out, he had no reason to live, leading to Mako asking the police to check on him. The police briefly detained Arad, but later released him, stating his life was not in danger.

Death
On Friday morning, February 2, 2018, Arad's body was found hanging in the garden of his home. Israeli police said his death was being treated as a suicide. He was 61.

On July 26, 2018 Mako issued an apology clarifying that at no point was it their intention to claim that Arad was involved at any time in a forced or non-consensual relations.

Awards 
 2016 - Mendel and Eva Pundik Prize for Israeli Art, Tel Aviv Museum of Art
 2006 - The Petach Tikva Museum of Art Prize
 2004 - Prize to Encourage Creativity, The Israeli Ministry of Science, Culture and Sport

Exhibitions 
Arad exhibited in Israel and around the world. His work was included in the exhibition Staring Back At The Sun: Video Art From Israel, 1970-2012 at the Koffler Centre of the Arts in Toronto.

Solo exhibitions
2019 - Weeping Willow, Rosenfeld Gallery, Tel Aviv
2017 - “1+0+1=2″, Rosenfeld Gallery, Tel Aviv
2016 - Behind all this Hides a Great Happiness, Rosenfeld Gallery, Tel Aviv
2015 - The Collector – Dana Gallery, Yad Mordehay
2013 - The Life, Rosenfeld Gallery, Tel Aviv
2012 - Sussita, Rosenfeld Gallery, Tel Aviv
2013 - The Sky is Blue Because We Live Inside the Eye of a Blue-Eyed Giant 
2011 - Folk Tune, Rosenfeld Gallery, Tel Aviv
2011 - Boaz Arad, Video and Photography, The Morel Derfler Gallery, Vizo Academy, Haifa
2009 - Kings of Israel, Rosenfeld Gallery, Tel Aviv
2009 - Hitler and I, virtual exhibition, Bezalel’s History & Theory website (http://bezalel.secured.co.il/zope/home/he/1252746792/1253422292)
2009 - Screenings, Tegen 2 Gallery, Stockholm, Sweden
2008 - Oi Va’avoi, Rosenfeld Gallery, Tel Aviv
2007 - Boaz Arad: VoozVooz, The Center for Contemporary Art, Tel Aviv (cat.)
1986 - Mapu Gallery, Tel Aviv
1985 - Chelouche Gallery, Tel Aviv

Videography 
Arad created the following video works:

 2015 - The collector
 2006 - The Annunciation, 5 min
 2005 - Gefiltefish, 11 min
 2004 - Until When?, 4:30 min
 2003 - Dual Movie, with Elyasaf Kowner, 12 min
 2003 - 21:40, with Miki Kratsman, 6:30 min
 2003 - Gordon and I, 4:30 min
 2003 - Lattice, with Tsibi Geva and Miki Kratsman, 53 min
 2003 - Kelev Andalusi, 15 min (after Salvador Dalם and Luis Buסuel’s Un Chien Andalou)
 2002 - Loop, unlimited duration
 2002 - Canal Street, 2 min
 2002 - Untitled, with Miki Kratsman, 40 min
 2001 - Immense Inner Peace, 6:30 min
 2000 - Hebrew Lesson, 12 sec
 2000 - Marcel Marcel, 27 sec
 1999 - The Man, 6 min
 1999 - 100 Beats, 1 min
 1999 - Safam (Mustache), 30 sec
 1999 - Safam 2, 13 sec

References

External links 

Artist profile by Artis

1956 births
2018 suicides
Israeli contemporary artists
Artists who committed suicide
Suicides by hanging in Israel
People from Tel Aviv